Blue Steel or blue steel may refer to:

Science, technology and engineering
 Blue steel, a tempering color of steel
 Bluing (steel), a process in which steel is partially protected against rust
 Martensite, a crystalline form of steel
 , a black oxide that may form when iron is heated
 Blue Steel (missile), a British Cold War nuclear missile

Film
 Blue Steel (1934 film), 1934 western starring John Wayne
R.O.T.O.R., a 1987 science fiction/action film also known as Blue Steel
 Blue Steel (1990 film), American action thriller film directed by Kathryn Bigelow
 Blue Steel Pose, Derek Zoolander's trademark look in Zoolander and Zoolander 2

Other uses
 Blue Steel, canceled DC video games by Factor 5
 Blue Steel guitar strings, made by Dean Markley Strings
 Tar Heel Blue Steel, a basketball team

See also
 Steel blue, a shade of blue that resembles blue steel
 Blue Stahli, a Detroit, Michigan-based electronic rock project (Stahl is a Germanic root word for steel)
 Arpeggio of Blue Steel, a 2014 manga and anime series
 Marking blue, a dye used in metalworking to aid in marking out rough parts for further machining
 Engineer's blue, for the purposes of layout or flattening, respectively, which is also referred to as bluing